Juma Ndiwa (born 28 November 1960) is a Kenyan former middle-distance runner specialising in the 800 metres. He represented his country at the 1984 and 1988 Summer Olympics as well as the 1983 World Championships. Additionally, he won the gold at the 1982 African Championships and bronze at the 1985 edition.

His personal best in the event is 1:44.20 set in Munich in 1983.

International competitions

References

1960 births
Living people
Kenyan male middle-distance runners
World Athletics Championships athletes for Kenya
Athletes (track and field) at the 1982 Commonwealth Games
Commonwealth Games bronze medallists for Kenya
Commonwealth Games medallists in athletics
Athletes (track and field) at the 1984 Summer Olympics
Athletes (track and field) at the 1988 Summer Olympics
Olympic athletes of Kenya
20th-century Kenyan people
Medallists at the 1982 Commonwealth Games